The Pursuit of Happiness is an American sitcom television series created by David Hackel, that aired on NBC from September 19 to November 7, 1995.

Premise
An idealistic lawyer is having a mid-life crisis early in life while having to deal with his unemployed wife and her annoying brother.

Cast
Tom Amandes as Steve Rutledge
Melinda McGraw as McKenzie Rutledge
Larry Miller as Larry Rutledge
Brad Garrett as Alex Chosek
Meredith Scott Lynn as Jean Mathias
Maxine Stuart as Eleanor Rutledge

Episodes

References

External links

1995 American television series debuts
1995 American television series endings
1990s American sitcoms
English-language television shows
Television shows set in Chicago
NBC original programming
Television series by CBS Studios